Canaples is a commune in the Somme department in Hauts-de-France in northern France.

Geography 

Population

Places of interest 
 The public Gardens

See also 
 Communes of the Somme department

References

External links 

 Canaples information
 The Chateau de Canaples

Communes of Somme (department)